

General Fritz Lindemann (11 April 1894 – 22 September 1944) was a German officer in the Wehrmacht of Nazi Germany and member of the resistance to Adolf Hitler.

Lindemann served as commander of the 132nd Infantry Division from January 1942 to August 1943, before appointment as Chief of Staff of the Artillery Oberkommando des Heeres.

Lindemann developed contacts with conspirators against Adolf Hitler including General Helmuth Stieff, and following the assassination of Hitler it was proposed that he would read the conspirators' proclamation to the German people over the radio, but he did not appear at the Bendlerblock on 20 July 1944 in order to do so. After the failure of the 20 July plot, he went into hiding. Lindemann was seriously wounded during his arrest by the Gestapo in September 1944 and died in hospital from his injuries. After standing trial for helping him at the Nazi People's Court, Erich and Elisabeth Gloeden, Elisabeth Kuznitzky, Hans Sierks and Carl Marks were all sentenced to death. They were executed by guillotine at Plötzensee Prison in September 1944.

Awards and decorations

 Knight's Cross of the Iron Cross on 4 September 1941 as Oberst and commander of Arko 138.

References

Citations

Bibliography

 Bauer, Frank (1995). Sie gaben ihr Leben: Unbekannte Opfer des 20. Juli 1944, General Fritz Lindemann und seine Fluchthelfer; Chronos Publ.
 Bidermann, Gottlob Herbert (2000). In Deadly Combat:  A German Soldier's Memoir of the Eastern Front; Univ. Press of Kansas Publ.

External links 
 dhm.de Biography of Fritz Lindemann

1894 births
1944 deaths
German anti-communists
People from Charlottenburg
German Army personnel of World War I
Prussian Army personnel
German Army generals of World War II
Generals of Artillery (Wehrmacht)
Recipients of the Gold German Cross
Recipients of the Knight's Cross of the Iron Cross
Recipients of the clasp to the Iron Cross, 1st class
20th-century Freikorps personnel
Military personnel from Berlin
Executed members of the 20 July plot
People executed by Nazi Germany by guillotine
People executed by guillotine at Plötzensee Prison